Makedonsko devojče is Macedonian song written and composed by Jonče Hristovski in the style of newly composed folk in 1964.  The title directly translates as 'Macedonian girl' or 'Macedonian maiden'.

Lyrics 
Makedonsko devojče as originally written consists of four stanzas.

See also
Music of North Macedonia

References

External links
Makedonsko devojče performed by Violeta Tomovska and Kiril Mančevski
Makedonsko devojce (Traditional Macedonian Folk Song)
Makedonsko devojce - Violeta Tomovska & Makedonska Calgija (Live)

Macedonian folk songs